The current Constitution of the Syrian Arab Republic was adopted on 26 February 2012, replacing one that had been in force since 13 March 1973. The current constitution delineates the basic function of that state's government. Among other things, it determines Syria's character to be Arab, democratic, and republican. Further, in line with pan-Arab ideology, it describes the country as a region of the wider Arab world and its people as an integral part of the Arab nation.

History

Early constitutions 
The Syrian Constitution of 1930, drafted by a committee under Ibrahim Hananu, was the founding constitution of the First Syrian Republic. The constitution required the President to be of Muslim faith (article 3). It was replaced by the Constitution of 5 September 1950, which was restored following the Constitution of 10 July 1953 and the Provisional Constitution of the United Arab Republic. It was eventually replaced by the Provisional Constitution of 25 April 1964 which itself was replaced by the Provisional Constitution of 1 May 1969.

Constitution of 1973 

A new constitution was adopted on 13 March 1973 and was in use until 27 February 2012. It entrenched the power of the Arab Socialist Ba'ath Party, its §8 describing the party as "the leading party in the society and the state", even if Syria was not, as is often believed, a one-party system in formal terms. The constitution has been amended twice. Article 6 was amended in 1981. The constitution was last amended in 2000 when the minimum age of the President was lowered from 40 to 34.

Constitution of 2012 
During the 2011–2012 Syrian uprising, a new constitution was put to a referendum. Amongst other changes:
 It abolished the old article 8, which had entrenched the power of the Ba'ath party. The new article 8 reads: "The political system is based on the principle of political pluralism, and rule is only obtained and exercised democratically through voting."
 In a new article 88, it introduced presidential elections and limited the term of office for the president to seven years with a maximum of one re-election.

The referendum resulted in the adoption of the new constitution, which came into force on 27 February 2012. The constitution guarantees equal rights and opportunities under the law, supplemented by labor laws which guarantee equal pay and maternity benefits for women. Effective power in Syria rests with the President of the Republic (since 2000, Bashar al-Assad, re–elected in 2014), who, according to §84 of the old constitution, was elected in an uncontested popular referendum on the proposal of the Syrian branch of the Ba'ath Party. However, in accordance with the new constitution, other parties withheld an opportunity to assume presidential roles in the country, evident as of the 2014 Syrian election.

Overview
This current constitution was a result of a constitutional referendum held in Syria on 26 February 2012. In response to the Syrian uprising, President Bashar al-Assad ordered a new constitution to be drafted. This constitutional referendum was not monitored by foreign observers.

The Constitution is divided into 6 parts (excluding the Introduction) which are called Chapters.
 Introduction
 Chapter 1: Basic Principles
 Chapter 2: Rights, Freedoms and the Rule of Law
 Chapter 3: State Authorities
 Chapter 4: The Supreme Constitutional Court
 Chapter 5: Amending the Constitution
 Chapter 6: General and Transitional Provisions

References

External links
 The 1930 Syrian Constitution (in its French version) is integrally reproduced in: 
 Constitution of Syria (1973) at the International Constitutional Law (ICL) Project
 Constitution of Syria (2012) (CC-BY-licensed English translation by Qordoba)
 Constitution of Syria (2012) (English translation by the Syrian Arab News Agency)

Constitutions of Syria